Events in the year 2001 in Namibia.

Incumbents 

 President: Sam Nujoma
 Prime Minister: Hage Geingob
 Chief Justice of Namibia: Johan Strydom

Events 

 The Democratic Resettlement Community, an informal settlement in Swakopmund, Erongo Region, was founded.

Deaths

References 

 
2000s in Namibia
Years of the 21st century in Namibia
Namibia
Namibia